James Timothy Hunt (born April 1, 1959) is an American-Canadian author and journalist. He has also written children's books under the pen name Tim Beiser.

Biography 

Hunt was born and raised in Los Angeles, California, and attended university in Montana, receiving a B.S. in Economics and Business Administration from Rocky Mountain College in 1981. He became a Canadian citizen in 2004, and resides in Toronto, Ontario, Canada, and Grignan, France, with his husband, Morton Beiser and twin sons, Daniel and Rowan.

Publishing 

During his 16 years as a resident of New York City, he became known as a playwright and author of science fiction short stories. His plays Angel Fire and The Lunatic were presented Off-Off Broadway. His short fiction can be found in the anthologies Lovers and Other Monsters and Don't Open This Book, both published by Doubleday. He has been writer in residence three times at the Helene Wurlitzer Foundation of New Mexico, and was the founder of The Writers' Workout creative writing studio in New York. He received a B.A.A. in Journalism from Toronto's Ryerson University in 1999.

Hunt has written for many publications in Canada, including National Post Business, Toronto Life, Elm Street, Reader's Digest, and Saturday Night. A feature article in Saturday Night in June 2000 about Owens Wiwa, brother of controversially-executed Nigerian environmentalist Ken Saro-Wiwa, was expanded in 2005 into a book about the ordeal, The Politics of Bones.

In 2007, Hunt began writing children's fiction for Tundra Books under the pseudonym Tim Beiser. He is the author of Bradley McGogg, the Very Fine Frog published by Tundra Books (2009). In his "fresh" rhyming verses, Beiser employs "all the tricks of the trade, such as enjambment, sound echoes, and internal rhyme."

Film and television 

Since 2013, Hunt as worked as a script supervisor, screenwriter, and actor in the film and television industry.

Books

As J. Timothy Hunt 
 The Politics of Bones
 Killing Time in Taos
 Madame de Sévigné and Her Children at the Court of Versailles, translator

As Tim Beiser 
 Bradley McGogg, the Very Fine Frog
 Miss Mousie's Blind Date
 Little Chicken Duck
 There, There

Awards and recognitions 
Hunt was recognized in 2005 by the 29th annual National Magazine Awards for an article in Saturday Night about his own same-sex marriage.

His profile of The New Yorker magazine's Malcolm Gladwell won three North American journalism awards and was nominated in 2000 for a Canadian National Magazine Award.

List of awards 
 Canada Council for the Arts: "The Marquise Skull Affair," (Creative Writing Grant), 2007
 Canadian National Magazine Award: "For Better or Worse?" (Nominee, Best Essay), 2006
 Canada Council for the Arts: "The Politics of Bones," (Creative Writing Grant), 2001
 Canadian National Magazine Award: "The politics of bones," (Nominee, Best Profile), 2001
 Canadian National Magazine Award: "Moving target," (Nominee, Best Technology Article), 2001
 Canadian National Magazine Award: "An Incredible Hodgepodge of Weirdness," (Nominee, Best Profile), 2000
 James H. Carter Award, 1999
 Mark Bastien Award: "An Incredible Hodgepodge of Weirdness," (Best Article), 1999
 AJEMC Award: "An Incredible Hodgepodge of Weirdness," (silver), 1999
 Gordon Sinclair Award, 1998
 Chinese Community Award, 1998
 Women's Press Club of Toronto Award, 1998
 Poets & Writers' Jean Paiva Award:"Best New Writer," 1993

As Tim Beiser
 Governor General's Award, Children's Literature Illustration (Nominee) 2009 & 2013 
 Canadian Booksellers Association Libris Award 2010—Children's Picture Book of the Year (Nominee)
 Ontario Library Association's 2010 Forest of Reading, Blue Spruce Award (Nominee) 
 Canadian Toy Testing Council, Top 10 Books of the year 2010.
 Chocolate Lily Book Awards 2010-2011, Picture book (Nominee)

References

External links 
Official Website

1959 births
American expatriate writers in Canada
American emigrants to Canada
Canadian male short story writers
Canadian male non-fiction writers
Canadian children's writers
Canadian gay writers
Journalists from Toronto
Living people
Naturalized citizens of Canada
Writers from Los Angeles
Writers from Toronto
Toronto Metropolitan University alumni
Rocky Mountain College alumni
Canadian LGBT dramatists and playwrights
Canadian male dramatists and playwrights
20th-century Canadian short story writers
21st-century Canadian short story writers
20th-century Canadian male writers
21st-century Canadian male writers
20th-century Canadian dramatists and playwrights
21st-century Canadian dramatists and playwrights
American gay writers
Gay dramatists and playwrights
21st-century Canadian LGBT people
20th-century Canadian LGBT people